Blad may refer to:

Newspapers
Eidsvoll Ullensaker Blad, a local newspaper published in Eidsvoll, Norway
Fredriksstad Blad, a local newspaper published in Fredrikstad, Norway
Indre Akershus Blad, a local newspaper published in Bjørkelangen, Norway
Nordstrands Blad, a local newspaper published in Oslo, Norway
Østlandets Blad, a regional newspaper published in Ski, Norway
Porsgrunds Blad, a defunct local newspaper, formerly published in Porsgrunn, Norway
Romerikes Blad, a local newspaper published in Skedsmo, Norway
Ringerikes Blad, a local newspaper published in Hønefoss, Norway
Sandefjords Blad, a local newspaper published in Sandefjord, Norway,
Stjørdalens Blad, a local newspaper published in Stjørdal, Norway
Tønsbergs Blad,  a local newspaper published in Tønsberg, Norway

People
Adrian Błąd (born 1991), Polish footballer
Augusta Blad (1871–1953), Danish actress
Mathias Blad, Swedish actor and singer
Tehilla Blad (born 1995), Swedish actress

Fungicides
Banda de Lupinus albus doce
BLAD-containing oligomer, an oligomer of the above, for example in Lupinus mutabilis